Te Vaka (English: The Canoe) is an Oceanic music group that performs original contemporary Pacific music or "South Pacific Fusion". The group was founded in 1995 by singer and songwriter Opetaia Foa'i in New Zealand. They have toured the world consistently since 1997 and have won a number of awards including the "Best Pacific Music Album" award from the New Zealand Music Awards for their albums Tutuki (2004) and Olatia (2007) and "Best Pacific Group" in the 2008 Pacific Music Awards According to the BBC, they are "the world's most successful band playing original contemporary Pacific music."

History

Te Vaka is a group of musicians and dancers with origins from various Polynesian backgrounds (including Tokelau, Tuvalu, Samoa and New Zealand) that formed in 1997, under the leadership of award-winning songwriter, Opetaia Foa'i. That year, they released their eponymous debut album through ARC Music, a UK/European record company. The album gained immediate success and recognition, being distributed to over 80 countries. Their follow-up album, Ki Mua, was released through Warm Earth Records, and went #1 on world music charts and mainstream radio in the South Pacific.

In 2002, the band released their third album, Nukukehe. The album gained the group a nomination in the New Zealand Music Awards and the BBC Radio 3 Awards for World Music. Their next albums entered the European World Music Charts, as well as winning numerous awards.

Through their career, Te Vaka has performed extensively around the world, performing in London’s Royal Festival Hall and Ronnie Scott's Jazz Club, as well as headlining music festivals throughout Europe like WOMAD. They have also performed at the APEC ministerial dinners and America's Cup events in Auckland, the Commonwealth Games in Melbourne, the Rugby World Cup in Paris and the Olympic Games in Beijing.

In 2010 and 2011, the band completed two tours in North America. That same year, Te Vaka released their seventh album, Havili.

In 2015, the band was selected by Walt Disney Pictures to contribute to the soundtrack of the 2016 animated film Moana.

Musical style
Te Vaka uses traditional musical instruments from the Pacific region like pate (single and double log drums), pa'u (indigenous goat skin conga), and bass drums.

Most of their songs are written in Tokelauan language, reflecting the heritage of band founder, singer, and main songwriter, Opetaia Foa'i. Foa'i was born in Western Samoa, to a Tokelauan father and a Tuvaluan mother, and raised in a Tokelauan community in New Zealand. He has said that the inspiration for his music comes from his multi-cultural upbringing. However, some songs are also written in Samoan and Tuvaluan languages, which are the native tongues of most of the other band members.

As a result of this mixture of sounds and diversity of influences, their music has been referred to as "a truly pan-Pacific sound".

Current lineup
Opetaia Foa'i: vocals, guitar, percussion
Olivia Foa'i: vocals, dance
Matatia Foa'i: percussion
Sulata Foai-Amiatu: vocals
Douglas Bernard (a.k.a. D.Burn): vocals, keyboards, percussion
Joe Toomata: electric guitar, percussion
Neil Forrest: bass, flute, percussion
Etueni (Edwin) Pita: dance
Dave Kuresa: dance

Awards and nominations
 
|-
|style="text-align:center;"| 2002
| 
| BBC Radio 3 Awards for World Music
|
|-
| rowspan="2" style="text-align:center;"| 2003
| Te Vaka
| BBC Radio 3 Awards for World Music - Audience Award
|
|-
| Nukukehe
| New Zealand Music Awards - Best Roots Album
|
|-
|style="text-align:center;"| 2004
| Tutuki
| New Zealand Music Awards - Best Pacific Music Album
|
|-
|style="text-align:center;"| 2005
| Opetaia Foa'i
| Senior Pacific Artist
|
|-
| rowspan="3" style="text-align:center;"| 2008
| Te Vaka
| Pacific Music Awards - Best Pacific Band
|
|-
| Te Vaka
| Australian Songwriters Association Awards - Best Live Performance of the Night
|
|-
| "Tamahana" 
| Australian Songwriters Association Awards - International
|
|-
| rowspan="3" style="text-align:center;"| 2010
| Haoloto
| New Zealand Music Awards
|
|-
| Te Vaka
| Pacific Music Awards - Best Pacific Group
|
|-
| Haoloto
| Best Pacific Language Album
|
|-
|style="text-align:center;"| 2011
| Haoloto
| Hawaiian Music Awards - Polynesian
|
|-
| rowspan="2" style="text-align:center;"| 2012
| Havili
| Pacific Music Awards
|
|-
|"Lovely World"
| ISC Awards - World Music
|
|-

Discography

Studio albums
 1997 Te Vaka
 1999 Ki Mua
 2002 Nukukehe
 2004 Tutuki
 2007 Olatia
 2009 Haoloto
 2011 Havili
 2015 Amataga
 2017 Te Vaka Beats: Percussion Album Vol. 1
 2020 Te Vaka Beats Vol. 2

Compilations
 2017 Greatest Hits: Songs That Inspired Moana

DVDs
 2003 Live at Apia Park
 2007 Live in Concert 2006

Singles
"Lakalaka"

References

External links 

Opetaia Foa'i official website
Olivia Foa'i official website

Tokelauan musicians
New Zealand musical groups
Musical groups established in 1995